Josef the Chaste is a 1953 West German comedy film directed by Carl Boese and starring Ludwig Schmitz, Waltraut Haas and Renate Mannhardt.

It is not a remake of Josef the Chaste (1930) with Harry Liedtke.

Cast
Ludwig Schmitz as Josef Haselhuhn
Waltraut Haas as Hilde Wolf
Renate Mannhardt as Pussy Angor
Peter Mosbacher as Georg Schilling
Lucie Englisch as Emilie Haselhuhn
Ernst Waldow as director Wolf
Gunther Philipp as Teddy Brand
Ewald Wenck as Knispel
Herbert Kiper as Weber
Alexa von Porembsky as Lotte Müller
Karin Von Dassel as Babette
Elena Luber as Marlise Haselhuhn
Erich Kestin as Martens
Erwin Biegel
Bruno Fritz as Bruckmann
Clemens Hasse as Schmaltollen-Emil
Paul Heidemann as bar director
Friedel Hensch as singer
Werner Müller as bandleader

See also
Business Under Distress (1931)
Wehe, wenn er losgelassen (1932)
The Dangerous Game (1933)

References

External links

1953 comedy films
German comedy films
West German films
Films directed by Carl Boese
German films based on plays
Constantin Film films
German black-and-white films
1950s German films